Clyde Daniel Schell (December 26, 1927 – May 11, 1972) was an American professional baseball player.

He signed with Philadelphia in 1948 and in 1953 led the Class A Eastern League in both hits (185) and batting average (.333). The following season, he made the 1954 Philles' Major League roster out of spring training and stuck for the entire season. He alternated in left field with veteran Del Ennis, starting in 58 games. For the year, Schell collected 77 hits, including 14 doubles, three triples and seven home runs. On June 26, he had four hits in four at bats, including a double and a home run, to  help defeat the Milwaukee Braves 10–3 and earn pitcher Robin Roberts his tenth victory of the season.

Schell went hitless in two at bats as a pinch hitter in April 1955 and was sent to the St. Louis Cardinals' organization. He played at Triple-A for the rest of his pro career, which ended after 11 seasons in 1958.

He died from a heart attack at the age of 44 in Mayville, Michigan.

References

External links

1927 births
1972 deaths
Appleton Papermakers players
Baltimore Orioles (IL) players
Baseball players from Michigan
Major League Baseball outfielders
Omaha Cardinals players
People from Tuscola County, Michigan
Philadelphia Phillies players
Richmond Virginians (minor league) players
Salina Blue Jays players
Schenectady Blue Jays players
Wilmington Blue Rocks (1940–1952) players